Emrys Killebrew is a fictional character that appears in comic books published by Marvel Comics as a supporting character of Deadpool. The character was created by writer Mark Waid and artist Ian Churchill.

Publication history 
Emrys Killebrew was created by writer Mark Waid and artist Ian Churchill in Deadpool: Sins of the Past #1 (August, 1994).

Fictional character biography 

Dr. Emrys Killebrew was a scientist who was supposed to handle the failed experiments from the Weapon X program until they died in his own laboratory called "the workshop". Killebrew appointed an assistant named Francis Freeman (who would go on to become the cyborg known as "Ajax"), then known by the alias "the Attending", to help him as an enforcer to keep the subjects in check. Killebrew would constantly experiment on and torture the countless patients who had been deemed failures by the Weapon X facility at his lab.

Many of his experiments would prove fatal to his test subjects as time went on at the workshop. Wade Wilson, who would become Deadpool, became one of his favorite patients because he was difficult to kill through all his testing and experiments, which only encouraged Killebrew to keep working on him. Finally, the Attending became sick and tired with Wilson's disrespectful attitude and arranged it so that Killebrew would have to kill Wade for disobedience, and get rid of him once and for all. However, Killebrew's final experiment, where he used some of Wolverine's DNA to give Wade a healing factor just like Wolverine's, caused Wade's enhanced healing factor to finally fully activate when he nearly died from the attempt to kill him. As soon as it happened, Wade was able to kill the Attending and make an escape out of the workshop with some fellow prisoners, while Killebrew made his own escape without being noticed by the others.

Sometime later, Killebrew returned to the Weapon X facility to help a dying Black Tom Cassidy, who was dying of illness, but before Killebrew could begin, Juggernaut came crashing through to rescue Tom and ended up taking Killebrew with him too, so that he could continue to find a cure for him. When Deadpool teamed up with Banshee and his daughter Siryn to find their cousin Black Tom, they also ended up finding Killebrew as well. At first, Deadpool wanted to kill Killebrew for what he did to him at the workshop, but eventually decided to spare him.

Killebrew met up with Deadpool again when his healing factor was beginning to fail him; Killebrew allowed Deadpool to find him and eventually helped him by using some of the Hulk's blood to restabilize Deadpool's healing factor. Even though he saved him, Deadpool still wanted to kill Killebrew for all he had done to him in the past. Deadpool spared him again because Siryn, who was with him, managed to convince Deadpool to be a better man and let Killebrew live. 

Even so, Deadpool still wanted to kill him if they ever met again. Their next meeting came when Killebrew's former assistant, the Attending (Francis Freeman), was resurrected through cybernetics as Ajax. Ajax wanted revenge on Deadpool and started tracking him down, killing many of the former patients of the Weapon X facility in order to find him, and finally came across Dr. Killebrew again. After torturing him for info, he was able to learn Deadpool's whereabouts and find him.  

When Killebrew woke up, he found himself watching Deadpool fight Ajax. Killebrew had enough and decided to take matters into his own hands when he saw Deadpool was losing the battle. Killebrew finally met his end at Ajax's hands after he risked his life to burn off Ajax's helmet, giving Deadpool an opening to beat Ajax.

Powers and abilities 
Dr. Killebrew had no special powers, but he was a brilliant scientist with degrees in genetic engineering and splicing.

References

External links 
http://marvel.wikia.com/wiki/Emrys_Killebrew_(Earth-616)
http://comicvine.gamespot.com/dr-killebrew/4005-23454/
http://marvel.wikia.com/wiki/Emrys_Killebrew

1994 comics debuts
Characters created by Mark Waid
Comics characters introduced in 1994
Fictional Canadian people
Marvel Comics scientists